Dillo Lombardi (10 January 1858 – 15 July 1935) was an Italian film actor of the silent era. He played a leading role in the 1914 film Lost in the Dark, seen as a precursor to Italian neorealism.

Selected filmography
 Lost in the Dark (1914)
 The Cry of the Eagle (1923)
 Orphan of Lowood (1926)
 Volga Volga (1928)
 The Secret Courier (1928)
  Artists (1928)

References

Bibliography 
 Goble, Alan. The Complete Index to Literary Sources in Film. Walter de Gruyter, 1999.

External links 
 

1858 births
1935 deaths
Italian male stage actors
Italian male film actors
Italian male silent film actors
Actors from Parma
20th-century Italian male actors